Astragalus pauperculus is an uncommon species of milkvetch known by the common name depauperate milkvetch. It is endemic to northern California, where it is known from the northern Sacramento Valley and the lowest reaches of the Cascade foothills adjacent. It grows in chaparral and vernally wet grassland habitat. The leaves are a few centimeters long and are made up of small widely spaced leaflets. The inflorescence bears two to seven flowers which are purple, sometimes with paler colored edges on their petals.

External links
Jepson Manual Treatment
USDA Plants Profile
Photo gallery

pauperculus
Flora of California
Flora without expected TNC conservation status